Back from the Dead 2 is a mixtape by Chief Keef. It is the sequel to the first Back from the Dead. The project is hosted by DJ Holiday and almost entirely produced by Keef himself. It is a complete departure from the traditional drill sound that Chief Keef was known for at the time, being heavily panned when released, it has since gained acclaim and a cult following due to its heavily stylized unique production.

Track listing

References

2014 albums
Sequel albums
Chief Keef albums
Self-released albums